John Anton Goldsmith (born 1951) is the Edward Carson Waller Distinguished Service Professor at the University of Chicago, with appointments in linguistics and computer science.

Biography
Goldsmith obtained his B.A. at Swarthmore College in 1972, and completed his PhD in Linguistics at MIT in 1976, under the linguist Morris Halle. He was on the faculty of the Department of Linguistics at Indiana University before joining the University of Chicago in 1984. He has taught at the LSA Linguistic Institutes and has held visiting appointments at many universities, such as McGill, Harvard, and UCSD. In 2007, Goldsmith was elected as a Fellow of the American Academy of Arts and Sciences.

Research
Goldsmith's research ranges from phonology to computational linguistics. His PhD thesis introduced autosegmental phonology; the idea that phonological phenomena is a collection of parallel tiers with individual segments, each representing certain features of speech. His more recent research focuses on unsupervised learning of linguistic structure (as demonstrated by the Linguistica project, a body of software that tries to automatically analyze the morphology of a language), as well as extending computational linguistics algorithms to bioinformatics.

Books
 John A Goldsmith, Bernard Laks, Battle in the Mind Fields, University of Chicago Press, 2018

External links
Goldsmith's homepage 
Autosegmental phonology (Goldsmith's doctoral dissertation)
Goldsmith's 2014 lecture at the University of Chicago

References

Linguists from the United States
Phonologists
Living people
Swarthmore College alumni
MIT School of Humanities, Arts, and Social Sciences alumni
University of Chicago faculty
1951 births
Distinguished professors in the United States
Fellows of the Linguistic Society of America